Wilhelmsdorf may refer to the following towns in Germany:

Wilhelmsdorf, Baden-Württemberg, in the district of Ravensburg
Wilhelmsdorf, Bavaria, in the district of Neustadt an der Aisch-Bad Windsheim
Wilhelmsdorf, Thuringia, in the Saale-Orla-Kreis district